Geoffrey Edwin Rickman, FBA, FRSE (9 October 1932 – 8 February 2010) was a British ancient historian.

References 

 https://www.scotsman.com/news/obituaries/obituary-geoffrey-rickman-2442870
 https://www.thebritishacademy.ac.uk/documents/1457/11_20-Geoffrey_Rickman.pdf

1932 births
2010 deaths
British historians
Fellows of the British Academy
Fellows of the Royal Society of Edinburgh
Academics of the University of St Andrews
Historians of ancient Rome
Alumni of Brasenose College, Oxford